Agyneta brusnewi is a species of sheet weaver found in Russia. It was described by Kulczyński in 1908.

References

brusnewi
Spiders of Russia
Spiders described in 1908